The 2019–20 UAB Blazers women's basketball team represents the University of Alabama at Birmingham during the 2019–20 NCAA Division I women's basketball season. The Blazers, led by seventh year head coach Randy Norton, play their home games at the Bartow Arena and are members of Conference USA.

Roster

Schedule

|-
!colspan=9 style=| Exhibition

|-
!colspan=9 style=| Non-conference regular season

|-
!colspan=9 style=| Conference USA regular season

|-
!colspan=9 style=| Conference USA Women's Tournament

See also
2019–20 UAB Blazers men's basketball team

References

UAB Blazers women's basketball seasons
UAB